Guenette is a settlement in Guadeloupe in the commune of Le Moule, on the island of Grande-Terre. 

Guenette may also refer to:

Alex Guenette (born 1996), Canadian stock car racing driver
Peter M. Guenette (1948–1968), United States Army soldier and recipient of the United States military's highest decoration
Robert Guenette (1935–2003), American screenwriter, director, and producer
Steve Guenette (born 1965), Canadian ice hockey player 
Wanda Guenette (born 1962), Canadian volleyball player